The 1974 Giro d'Italia was the 57th edition of the Giro d'Italia, one of cycling's Grand Tours. The field consisted of 140 riders, and 96 riders finished the race.

By rider

By nationality

References

1974 Giro d'Italia
1974